Jalamanta is Brant Bjork's debut solo effort after leaving Kyuss and joining Fu Manchu. Originally released in 1999 on now defunct Man's Ruin Records label, Jalamanta was re-released on Bjork's own label, Duna Records, in 2003, 2006 and 2009. In 2019, Bjork's current label Heavy Psych Sounds 'remixed and remastered' the album with new artwork.

Track listing

Notes
 The original Man's Ruin album lists track #5 as "Oasis Layback", but was changed on the Duna release to "Sun Brother".
 The 2019 reissue of Jalamanta features a track listing including "Take Me Away" and "Bones Lazy", the latter being the instrumental intro of "Low Desert Punk" from the original release.

Credits
Drums, guitars, bass, percussion, vocals: Brant Bjork
Recorded the first week of February 1999 at Rancho de la Luna, Joshua Tree, California
Produced by Rosa. Engineered by Tony Mason. Mixed by Tony Mason & Rosa. Mastered by Schneebie 
Additional guitars by Mario Lalli & Gary Arce. "Toot" lyrics by Mario Lalli

References

Brant Bjork albums
1999 debut albums
Man's Ruin Records albums